Venustiano Carranza is a small community located in the Mexican State of Baja California. It is located in the municipality of Mexicali and serves as a borough seat of its surrounding area.

The intersection of Baja California State Highways 1 and 4 there is called the Crucero Ledón. It is located 50 kilometers south of Mexicali, the capital of Baja California. The 2010 census reported a population of 6,098 inhabitants.

It is also known for its delicious taquitos. There is also a gas station (Pemex) and a small church on Baja California #4.

Sister Ejidos
 Guadalupe Victoria, Baja California
 Ciudad Morelos, Baja California
 Luis B.Sanchez(KM.57), Baja California
 Durango(KM.49), Baja California
 Ejido Sonora, Baja California
 Ejido Janitzio, Baja California
 Ejido LA Puerta, Baja California
 Ejido Oaxaca, Baja California
 Ejido Delta, Baja California

References
 2010 census tables: INEGI

Mexicali Municipality
Boroughs of Mexicali
Populated places in Baja California